Lotzorai is a comune (municipality) in the Province of Nuoro in the Italian region Sardinia, located about  northeast of Cagliari and about  northeast of Tortolì.

Lotzorai borders the following municipalities: Baunei, Girasole, Talana, Tortolì, Triei, Villagrande Strisaili.

The town's economy is based on agriculture and tourism. Lotzorai's territory is home to several walks, including  those to Cala Goloritzè and the Gole su Gorroppu Lotzorai, while the Selvaggio Blu starts  from Lotzorai in Santa Maria Navarrese. Other sights include a pre-Nuragic necropolis with thirteen Domus de Janas, the Medusa Castle (a medieval fortress built over a pre-existing Phoenician structure, now in ruins) and other pre-Nuragic and Nuragic excavations.

References

Cities and towns in Sardinia